Biggsville is a village in Henderson County, Illinois, United States. The population was 304 at the 2010 census, down from 343 at the 2000 census. It is part of the Burlington, IA–IL Micropolitan Statistical Area.

Geography
Biggsville is located in east-central Henderson County in the valley of South Henderson Creek. Illinois Route 94 passes through the center of the village, leading north  to Aledo and south  to La Harpe. U.S. Route 34 bypasses the village to the south, leading east  to Galesburg and west  to Burlington, Iowa.

Demographics

As of the census of 2000, there were 343 people, 143 households, and 96 families residing in the village. The racial makeup of the village was 98.83% White and 1.17% African American. Hispanic or Latino of any race were 2.04% of the population.

There were 143 households, out of which 31.5% had children under the age of 18 living with them, 55.2% were married couples living together, 7.7% had a female householder with no husband present, and 32.2% were non-families. 30.1% of all households were made up of individuals, and 16.1% had someone living alone who was 65 years of age or older. The average household size was 2.40 and the average family size was 2.94.

In the village, the population was spread out, with 24.5% under the age of 18, 8.7% from 18 to 24, 25.4% from 25 to 44, 22.2% from 45 to 64, and 19.2% who were 65 years of age or older. The median age was 39 years. For every 100 females, there were 96.0 males. For every 100 females age 18 and over, there were 91.9 males.

The median income for a household in the village was $35,714, and the median income for a family was $43,125. Males had a median income of $30,833 versus $16,250 for females. The per capita income for the village was $17,215. About 6.3% of families and 7.5% of the population were below the poverty line, including 8.6% of those under age 18 and 4.6% of those age 65 or over.

Notable people
Todd Hamilton, golfer
Ora Smith, farmer and politician

References

Villages in Henderson County, Illinois
Villages in Illinois
Burlington, Iowa micropolitan area